The Kansas Women's Bill of Rights is a bill which bans any identification of any gender outside the gender assigned at birth in the US state of Kansas, despite federal recognition of transgender people, the bill is generally considered transphobic. The current governor of Kansas Laura Kelly has stated she plans to veto the bill.

Despite the fact that the federal government recognizes gender transition on things like passports, birth certificates and housing, the bill would completely reject transgender people as an identity. The bill restricts agencies, both public and private from assigning any gender other then that assigned at birth. It is largely seen to take away human rights that trans people have in the state of Kansas, as well as to criminalize identifying as transgender.

See also
 Transphobia
 LGBT rights by country or territory

References

Women's rights in the United States
LGBT rights in Kansas
Transphobia